List of ships built by Aberdeen shipbuilders Hall, Russell & Company, from yard number 201 to 300.

The ships built in the sequence 201 to 300 cover the period 1876 — 1896. The majority of vessels built during this period were smaller cargo vessels, such as those built for the North of Scotland, Orkney & Shetland Steam Navigation Company, that would go on to become a regular customer of the yard. Notable vessels during this period include the Zafiro, the first steel vessel built by the yard and the Balgairn which was wrecked two days into its delivery voyage to Cardiff.

Notes

 Where available, vessel measurements taken from Lloyd's Register, giving registered length, beam and draft. Hall, Russell and Company's own measurements typically are length overall, beam and moulded depth.
 Yard Number 226 (Balgairn) wrecked 2 days after leaving Aberdeen on delivery/maiden voyage to Cardiff, and was the shortest lived ship built by Hall, Russell and Company.

References

Ships built in Scotland